The 8 Letters Tour was the fourth headlining concert tour by American boy band Why Don't We, in support of their first studio album, 8 Letters (2018). The tour began in Phoenix, Arizona at the Comerica Theatre on March 20, 2019, and concluded in Auckland, New Zealand at Spark Arena on November 29, 2019.

Background and development 
Following the release of 8 Letters, Why Don't We announced they would embark on their fourth headlining concert tour, following the Taking You Tour, (2017), the Something Different Tour (2017),  and the "Invitation Tour" (2018). Dates were first announced for North America in September 2018, with the tour beginning in March and ending in April. In February 2019, the band announced more North American dates, beginning in July and ending in August. In June, dates in Australia and New Zealand were added. Dates for Asia were announced in July.

Eben was announced as the band's opening act for all North American shows as well as the first Asian leg. In June, it was announced he would open on the Oceania leg. Brynn Elliot was an opener for all shows of the first North American leg aside from the Honolulu show. Taylor Grey was announced as an opener for some European shows.

Setlist 
This setlist is representative of the show on March 29, 2019, in Sugar Land. It does not represent all the shows from the tour.

"Trust Fund Baby"
"M.I.A"
"Choose"
"Hard"
"Friends"
"In Too Deep"
"Nobody Gotta Know"
"I Depend on You"
"Runner"
"Why Don't We Just"
"Something Different"
"Taste" / "Finesse" / "Lucid Dreams" / "Better Now"
"Taking You"
"These Girls"
"Hooked"
"Talk"
"8 Letters"
"Big Plans"
"Cold in LA"
"I Don't Belong in This Club"

Tour dates

References

2019 concert tours